Schedule 1 may refer to:
 Schedule I Controlled Substances within the US Controlled Substances Act
 Schedule I Controlled Drugs and Substances within the Canadian Controlled Drugs and Substances Act
 Schedule I Psychotropic Substances within the Thai Psychotropic Substances Act
 Schedule I Narcotic Drugs and Psychotropic Substances within the Estonian Narcotic Drugs and Psychotropic Substances Act
 Schedule I Psychotropic Substances within the U.N. Convention on Psychotropic Substances
 Schedule I Banks within the Canada Bank Act
 Schedule 1 Substances within the Chemical Weapons Convention
  Schedule 1 to the National Health Service (General Medical Services Contracts) (Prescription of Drugs etc.) Regulations 2004, the NHS treatments blacklist

See also 
Schedule 2 (disambiguation)
Schedule 3 (disambiguation)
Schedule 4 (disambiguation)
Schedule 5 (disambiguation)